Denny Kantono (born 12 January  1970) is a retired Chinese-Indonesian badminton player who specialized in men's doubles. He shared numerous international titles with his regular partner Antonius Ariantho including the French (1993), Hong Kong (1993), Denmark (1994), Thailand (1994), Chinese Taipei (1995, 1999), and Indonesia (1996) Opens; as well as the (now defunct) Badminton World Cup (1996) and World Badminton Grand Prix (1998) events. They were runners-up at the prestigious All-England Championships in 1995 and bronze medalists at the 1996 Olympics in Atlanta.

Kantono competed in badminton at the 1996 Summer Olympics in men's doubles, with Antonius Ariantho, and won a bronze medal. They lost in semifinals against Cheah Soon Kit and Yap Kim Hock, of Malaysia, 15–10, 15–4, and in the bronze medal match they defeated Soo Beng Kiang and Tan Kim Her, of Malaysia, 15–4, 12–15, 15–8.

Personal life 
Kantono has a daughter that also a badminton athlete name Serena Kani who plays in 2015 BWF World Junior Championships in Peru.

Achievements

Olympic Games 
Men's doubles

World Cup 
Men's doubles

Asian Championships 
Men's doubles

Asian Cup 
Men's doubles

Southeast Asian Games 
Men's doubles

Mixed doubles

IBF World Grand Prix 
The World Badminton Grand Prix sanctioned by International Badminton Federation (IBF) since 1983.

Men's doubles

Mixed doubles

 IBF Grand Prix tournament
 IBF Grand Prix Finals tournament

IBF International 
Men's doubles

References 

 General

 Denny Kantono Olympic medals and stats @ databaseOlympics.com

External links 
 

1970 births
Living people
People from Samarinda
Sportspeople from East Kalimantan
Indonesian people of Chinese descent
Indonesian male badminton players
Badminton players at the 1996 Summer Olympics
Olympic badminton players of Indonesia
Olympic bronze medalists for Indonesia
Olympic medalists in badminton
Medalists at the 1996 Summer Olympics
Competitors at the 1993 Southeast Asian Games
Competitors at the 1995 Southeast Asian Games
Southeast Asian Games gold medalists for Indonesia
Southeast Asian Games silver medalists for Indonesia
Southeast Asian Games bronze medalists for Indonesia
Southeast Asian Games medalists in badminton
World No. 1 badminton players